Wenzel von Linhart (6 June 1821, Seelowitz – 22 October 1877, Würzburg) was an Austrian surgeon.

He studied medicine in Vienna, where his influences included anatomist Christian Joseph Berres and surgeon Joseph Wattmann. From 1845 to 1849, he was an assistant in the lectures of Johann von Dumreicher, and in 1852 became a privat-docent of operative surgery at the University of Vienna. In 1856 he replaced Adolf Morawek (1816-1855) as professor of the surgical clinic at the University of Würzburg. As a result of his work with the wounded in the Austro-Prussian War (1866), he was named Royal Bavarian Councillor in 1867. During the Franco-Prussian War, he distinguished himself in his role as a Bavarian general physician.

Published works 
An adherent of topographical anatomy, he was a skilled surgeon and considered an excellent teacher. The following are three of his principal writings.
 Ueber die Schenkelhernie, 1852 - On the femoral hernia.
 Compendium der chirurgischen Operationslehre, (1856; fourth edition, 1874) - Compendium of surgical operation lectures.
 Vorlesungen über Unterleibs-Hernien (1866; new edition, 1882) -  Lectures on abdominal hernias.

References 

1821 births
1877 deaths
People from Židlochovice
People from the Margraviate of Moravia
Moravian-German people
Austrian surgeons
Academic staff of the University of Würzburg
Austrian people of Moravian-German descent